Geneseo Township is one of twenty-four townships in Henry County, Illinois, USA.  As of the 2010 census, its population was 7,468 and it contained 3,407 housing units.

Geography

Cities, towns, villages
 Geneseo

Adjacent townships
 Phenix Township (north)
 Loraine Township (northeast)
 Atkinson Township (east)
 Cornwall Township (southeast)
 Munson Township (south)
 Osco Township (southwest)
 Edford Township (west)
 Hanna Township (west)

Cemeteries
The township contains these three cemeteries: Mizpan, North and Oakwood.

Major highways
  Interstate 80
  U.S. Route 6
  Illinois Route 82

Airports and landing strips
 Black Hawk Heliport
 Dewey E Greene Airport
 Gen Airpark

Landmarks
 Hennepin Canal Parkway State Park (east half)
 Hennepin Canal Pkwy State Park (west edge)
 Richmond Hill Park

Demographics

School districts
 Geneseo Community Unit School District 228

Political districts
 Illinois's 14th congressional district
 State House District 71
 State House District 90
 State Senate District 36
 State Senate District 45

References
 United States Census Bureau 2008 TIGER/Line Shapefiles
 
 United States National Atlas

External links
 City-Data.com
 Illinois State Archives
 Township Officials of Illinois

Townships in Henry County, Illinois
Townships in Illinois